Billy Keast (born 24 November 1996) is an English professional rugby union player. He predominantly plays as a loosehead prop but has played as a tighthead prop before.

Keast's father, Richard, played prop for Redruth and Cornwall. Keast was educated at Truro College. He represented England at U18 and U20 Rugby.

Keast plays for Premiership Rugby side the Exeter Chiefs. In November 2016 he made his Chiefs debut in an Anglo-Welsh Cup clash away to Harlequins. Keast started in the same competition a week later as the Chiefs beat Cardiff Blues 62–25 at Sandy Park. In 2016 he played for Redruth on loan, and in August 2017 he joined the Cornish Pirates on loan. In 2020 he was playing for the Chiefs.

References

1996 births
Living people
Exeter Chiefs players
Rugby union players from Truro
Rugby union props